The Colorado Council on the Arts was an agency of the state government of Colorado, responsible for the promotion of the arts. In July 2010, the Council on the Arts and Art in Public Places programs merged to become Colorado's Creative Industries Division. Its budget combines state funds with federal funds from the National Endowment for the Arts. Its offices are located in Denver.

See also
State of Colorado

External links
Colorado Council on the Arts website

State agencies of Colorado
Arts councils of the United States
Colorado culture